Static Anonymity is an EP released by the Canadian band Metric in 2001. The back cover of the album states that "This handmade collection of rare songs is only available at Metric performances or at www.ilovemetric.com and is not intended for retail sale". Though it states that one can buy the album via the band's official website, this is no longer true. However, the songs "Grow Up and Blow Away", "Soft Rock Star", and "London Halflife" were included on the 2007 release of their third album Grow Up and Blow Away.

The EP was released as a way for the band's music to get their music out to fans while their album "Grow Up and Blow Away" was delayed being released.

Track listing

References 

2001 EPs
Metric (band) EPs